Frank Løndal Jensen (born 23 March 1962 in Denmark) is a Danish retired footballer.

Career

Løndal started his career with Herfølge Boldklub, helping them achieve promotion to the Danish top flight with 24 goals at the age of 22. Despite interest from German Bundesliga side SV Werder Bremen, Roda JC in the Netherlands, English club Watford, Panathinaikos in Greece, as well as Rangers, one of the most successful Scottish teams,  he signed for Danish top flight outfit Næstved Boldklub before returning to Herfølge Boldklub.

On the 22nd of April 1984, Løndal made his solitary appearance for the Denmark national team against Poland but soon suffered an injury, causing him to miss out on the UEFA Euro 1984 squad.

References

External links
 

Danish men's footballers
Living people
Association football forwards
1962 births
Herfølge Boldklub players
Denmark international footballers
Næstved Boldklub players